Martín Rodríguez (born 5 October 1974) is an Argentine sailor. He competed in the men's 470 event at the 1996 Summer Olympics.

References

External links
 

1974 births
Living people
Argentine male sailors (sport)
Olympic sailors of Argentina
Sailors at the 1996 Summer Olympics – 470
Place of birth missing (living people)